Statistics of Úrvalsdeild in the 1949 season.

Overview
It was contested by 5 teams, and KR won the championship. KR's Ólafur Hannesson and Hörður Óskarsson, as well as Fram's Guðmundur Jónsson, were the joint top scorers with 4 goals.

League standings

Results

References

Úrvalsdeild karla (football) seasons
Iceland
Iceland
Urvalsdeild